Fantasia Mathematica 
is an anthology published in 1958 containing stories, humor, poems, etc., all on mathematical topics, compiled by Clifton Fadiman. A companion volume was published as The Mathematical Magpie (1962).  The volume contains writing by authors including Robert Heinlein, Aldous Huxley, H. G. Wells, and Martin Gardner.

Contents
"Introduction" by Clifton Fadiman

Odd numbers
"Young Archimedes" by Aldous Huxley
"Pythagoras and the Psychoanalyst" by Arthur Koestler
"Mother and the Decimal Point" by Richard Llewellyn
"Jurgen Proves It by Mathematics" by James Branch Cabell
"Peter Learns Arithmetic" by H. G. Wells
"Socrates and the Slave" by Plato
"The Death of Archimedes" by Karel Čapek

Imaginaries
"The Devil and Simon Flagg" by Arthur Porges
"—And He Built a Crooked House" by Robert A. Heinlein
"Inflexible Logic" by Russell Maloney
"No-Sided Professor" by Martin Gardner
"Superiority" by Arthur C. Clarke
"The Mathematical Voodoo" by H. Nearing, Jr.
"Expedition" by Fredric Brown
"The Captured Cross-Section" by Miles J. Breuer, M.D.
"A. Botts and the Moebius Strip" by William Hazlett Upson
"God and the Machine" by Nigel Balchin
"The Tachypomp" by Edward Page Mitchell
"The Island of Five Colors" by Martin Gardner
"The Last Magician" by Bruce Elliott
"A Subway Named Moebius" by A. J. Deutsch
"The Universal Library" by Kurd Lasswitz
"Postscript to "The Universal Library"" by Willy Ley
"John Jones's Dollar" by Harry Stephen Keeler

Fractions
"A New Ballad of Sir Patrick Spens" by Arthur T. Quiller-Couch
"The Unfortunate Topologist" by Cyril Kornbluth
"There Once Was a Breathy Baboon" by Sir Arthur Eddington
"Yet What Are All..." by Lewis Carroll
"Twinkle, Twinkle, Little Star" by Ralph Barton
"Mathematical Love" by Andrew Marvell
"The Circle" by Christopher Morley
"The Circle and the Square" by Thomas Dekker
"Euclid Alone Has Looked on Beauty Bare" by Edna St. Vincent Millay
"Euclid" by Vachel Lindsay
"To Think That Two and Two Are Four" by A. E. Housman
"The Uses of Mathematics" by Samuel Butler
"Arithmetic" by Carl Sandburg
"Threes (To Be Sung By Niels Bohr)" by John Atherton
"Plane Geometry" by Emma Rounds
"He Thought He Saw Electrons Swift" by Herbert Dingle
"Fearsome Fable" by Bruce Elliott
"Bertrand Russell's Dream" by G. H. Hardy
"For All Practical Purposes" by C. Stanley Ogilvy
"Eternity: A Nightmare" by Lewis Carroll
"An Infinity of Guests" by George Gamow
"∞" by Sir Arthur Eddington
"No Power on Earth" by William Whewell
"(x + 1)" by Edgar Allan Poe
"The Receptive Bosom" by Edward Shanks
"Leinbach's Proof" by Arthur Schnitzler
"Problem from The New Yorker: "Talk of the Town""
"A Letter to Tennyson from Mathematical Gazette"
"A Fable from Mathematical Gazette"
"There Was a Young Man from Trinity" by Anonymous
"There Was an Old Man Who Said, "Do"" by Anonymous
"Relativity" by Anonymous
"There Was a Young Fellow Named Fisk" by Anonymous

References 

1958 anthologies
Mathematics fiction books
Fiction anthologies